Visual Diary is the first full Cantonese-language album by Hong Kong pop singer-actor Edison Chen. On this album, His genre focuses mainly in the mainstream pop combining of pop-rock flavor and RnB.

Background
The song "New Stimulus" was used for his Pepsi campaign both sung in Cantonese and Mandarin under the title "Thirst". The song "Release" features label mate Joey Yung singing the chorus parts.

He collaborated with foreign musicians/producers including Korean singer Kang Ta for penning the song "回頭路" (Going Back).

"When Love'S Gonna End" was the only English song in the album.

Track listing
 愛火 Fire Of Love
 放任 Release (featuring Joey Yung)
 緋聞 Gossip
 請早說 Please Say It Early
 雙手插袋 Both Hands In Pockets
 新刺激 New Stimulus 
 When love's gonna end
 凍飲 Cold Drink
 回頭路 Going Back
 解渴 Thirst (Mandarin Version of "New Stimulus")
 心中最愛 Mind's Favorites

Limited Editions
Visual Diary Version 2 album comes with a candid photos of Chen and a live album of his debut concert tour "EDISON 64" in which was held in Japan.

External links
 Lyrics - Visual Diary album - In Chinese

2001 albums
Edison Chen albums